Xerochloa is a genus of Australian and Southeast Asian plants in the grass family.

 Species
 Xerochloa barbata R.Br. - Western Australia, Northern Territory, Queensland
 Xerochloa imberbis R.Br. - rice grass - Thailand, Java, Western Australia, Northern Territory, Queensland
 Xerochloa laniflora Benth. - Western Australia, Northern Territory, Queensland

 formerly included
see Apluda 
 Xerochloa latifolia - Apluda mutica

References

External links
 Grassbase - The World Online Grass Flora

Panicoideae
Poaceae genera
Grasses of Asia
Grasses of Oceania